Balmain Public School is an Australian state primary school in the inner-west Sydney suburb of Balmain. It is popularly known as "Pigeon Ground" or "Pigeon Park" due to the one-time pigeon-shooting pastime in adjacent Gladstone Park.

The school began as a one-teacher school in a tiny wooden building and became a National School in 1860 with an enrolment of 138 pupils. In 1861 plans were drawn up for a brick building next to the Catholic Church on the edge of Gladstone Park which was completed and occupied in November 1862, complemented by new rooms in 1864 to accommodate the 350 pupils and five teachers. The school was accorded secondary classes in 1864.

In 1876 a two-storey building was erected for a Girls' and an Infants' department. 1269 children were enrolled by 1883. A new infants building was erected in 1892, and by 1912 the school was separated from Gladstone Park.

A three-storey building was completed in 1915 and became known as the Girls' Building. The boys moved into the 1876 building and the 1862 building was sold to the Catholic Church for their extensions in 1920. An evening school was established in 1899. In 1901 special classes were begun  for what were then called retarded children, perhaps the earliest of such classes in New South Wales.  

Girls' secondary classes ceased in 1950 and boys' in 1959.

The 1876 building was devastated by fire in 1959 and subsequently refurbished.

References
 https://balmain-p.schools.nsw.gov.au/about-our-school/school-history.html

Public primary schools in Sydney
Educational institutions established in 1887
Balmain, New South Wales
1887 establishments in Australia